Paulino "Pau" Miguélez Fernández (born 23 January 1999) is a Spanish footballer who plays for Hércules CF as a left winger.

Club career
Born in Noja, Cantabria, Miguélez was a Racing de Santander youth graduate. He made his senior – and first team – debut on 23 August 2015 at the age of 16, playing the last 12 minutes of a 0–1 Segunda División B away loss against Celta de Vigo B; he spent the campaign switching between the main squad and the reserves in the Tercera División.

Miguélez scored his first senior goal on 22 August 2016, netting a brace with the B's in a 5–1 away routing of Selaya FC. He only started to feature regularly for the first team in the 2017–18 season, with the side still in the third division.

On 20 July 2018, Miguélez signed a three-year deal with Girona FC, being assigned to the farm team also in the third tier. On 10 July of the following year, he moved to another reserve team, Sevilla Atlético in the same category.

On 29 January 2020, Miguélez joined UD Las Palmas, being assigned to the B-side still in division three. He made his professional debut on 10 January of the following year, coming on as a late substitute for Kirian Rodríguez in a 1–0 away win against RCD Mallorca in the Segunda División.

On 13 July 2021, Miguélez signed a one-year contract with Hércules CF of the Segunda División RFEF.

References

External links

1998 births
Living people
Spanish footballers
Footballers from Cantabria
Association football wingers
Segunda División players
Segunda División B players
Tercera División players
Rayo Cantabria players
Racing de Santander players
CF Peralada players
Sevilla Atlético players
UD Las Palmas Atlético players
UD Las Palmas players
Hércules CF players
Spain youth international footballers